Politano is an Italian surname. Notable people with the surname include:

Antonio Politano (born 1967), Italian cyclist
Matteo Politano (born 1993), Italian footballer
Wladimiro Politano (born 1940), Italian sculptor, painter, and drawer

Italian-language surnames